George Henry Knight  (November 24, 1855 – October 4, 1912) was a major league baseball player for the 1875 New Haven Elm Citys. He also umpired three games.

Sources

1855 births
1912 deaths
Major League Baseball pitchers
New Haven Elm Citys players
19th-century baseball players
Baseball players from Connecticut
People from Lakeville, Connecticut